The 1963–64 British Ice Hockey season featured a Scottish League but there was still no league structure in England for the fourth consecutive year. Durham Wasps competed in the Scottish League.

Scottish League
The two groups played an interlocking schedule.

Regular season

Group A

Group B

Final
Fife Flyers defeated the Paisley Mohawks

References

British
1963 in English sport
1964 in English sport
1963 in Scottish sport
1964 in Scottish sport